Parascolopsis is a genus of threadfin breams native to the Indian Ocean and western Pacific Ocean.

Species
The currently recognized species in this genus are:
 Parascolopsis akatamae Miyamoto, CALEB D. MCMAHAN,  & ATSUSHI KANEKO
 Parascolopsis aspinosa (Manikyala Rao & Srinivasa Rao, 1981) (smooth dwarf monocle bream)
 Parascolopsis baranesi B. C. Russell & Golani, 1993
 Parascolopsis boesemani (Manikyala Rao & Srinivasa Rao, 1981) (redfin dwarf monocle bream)
 Parascolopsis capitinis B. C. Russell, 1996
 Parascolopsis eriomma (D. S. Jordan & R. E. Richardson, 1909) (rosy dwarf monocle bream)
 Parascolopsis inermis (Temminck & Schlegel, 1843) (unarmed dwarf monocle bream)
 Parascolopsis melanophrys B. C. Russell & P. K. Chin, 1996 (dwarf monocle bream)
 Parascolopsis qantasi B. C. Russell & Gloerfelt-Tarp, 1984 (slender dwarf monocle bream)
 Parascolopsis rufomaculatus B. C. Russell, 1986 (red-spot dwarf monocle bream)
 Parascolopsis tanyactis B. C. Russell, 1986 (long-rayed dwarf monocle bream)
 Parascolopsis tosensis (Kamohara, 1938) (Tosa dwarf monocle bream)
 Parascolopsis townsendi Boulenger, 1901 (scaly dwarf monocle bream)

References

Nemipteridae